The 1931 Colorado College Tigers football team was an American football team that represented Colorado College  as a member of the Rocky Mountain Conference (RMC) during the 1931 college football season. In its sixth year under head coach William T. Van de Graaff, the team compiled an overall record of 4–4 with a mark of 4–3 in conference play, placing sixth in the RMC.

Schedule

References

Colorado College
Colorado College Tigers football seasons
Colorado College Tigers football